The 2022 Kent State Golden Flashes football team represented Kent State University in the 2022 NCAA Division I FBS football season. They are led by fifth-year head coach Sean Lewis and play their home games at Dix Stadium in Kent, Ohio, as members of the East Division of the Mid-American Conference.

Previous season

The Golden Flashes finished the 2021 season 7–7 and 6-2 in the MAC to finish in first place in the East Division.  They lost to Northern Illinois in the MAC Championship Game.  They played in the Famous Idaho Potato Bowl and lost to Wyoming.

Schedule

Game summaries

at Washington

at No. 7 Oklahoma

Long Island

at No. 1 Georgia

Ohio

at Miami (OH)

at Toledo

Akron

Ball State

at Bowling Green

Eastern Michigan

at Buffalo

References

Kent State
Kent State Golden Flashes football seasons
Kent State Golden Flashes football